General elections were held in Aruba on 12 December 1997. The Aruban People's Party emerged as the largest party, winning ten of the 21 seats in the Estates.

Results

References

Elections in Aruba
Aruba
1997 in Aruba
December 1997 events